Nelly Alisheva (born 20 December 1983 in Lipetsk) is a retired Russian volleyball player, who last played for VK Proton.

Career
She started her career at MGFSO. Afterwards, she played for Dinamo-Yantar from 2003 to 2011, then Omitchka Omsk from 2011 to 2013, before settling in at VK Proton.

Personal life
Nelly Alisheva has a daughter named Vasilisa, born in June 2002. Vasilisa is also a volleyball player.

References

External links
 CEV Player Information

1983 births
Russian women's volleyball players
Living people
Sportspeople from Lipetsk
20th-century Russian women
21st-century Russian women